Raj Kumar Goel Engineering College (RKGEC), founded in 2007, was a technical institute in the city of Pilkhuwa, Hapur district, Uttar Pradesh, India. It was recognized by the All India Council for Technical Education. It was managed by an educational trust known as the Raj Kumar Goel Educational Foundation. The college shut down in 2017.

Academic programmes 
RKGEC, Pilkhuwa offers undergraduate and postgraduate programmes in engineering and management. The college provides degree courses in Civil Engineering, Computer Science & Engineering, Electrical & Electronics Engineering, Electronics & Communication Engineering, Mechanical Engineering, and Information Technology.

Facilities 
 Library with more than 35,000 books
 Stationery shop with photocopying facility
 In-campus 24-7 Wi-Fi-enabled hostel facility
 Conveyance available for medical cases and all placement activities
 Computer centres are equipped with Core i3 3.2 GHz, 2 GB RAM systems with 40 Mbit/s fiber optic connectivity
 Cricket grounds, football field, cemented basketball court, volleyball court, cemented badminton court, table tennis tables.

References

Engineering colleges in Uttar Pradesh
Hapur district
Educational institutions established in 2007
2007 establishments in Uttar Pradesh